Santa Rita, Paraíba is a municipality in the state of Paraíba in the Northeast Region of Brazil.

Santa Cruz Recreativo Esporte Clube is the municipality's football club.
In this municipality is located the Presidente Castro Pinto International Airport which serves the state capital, João Pessoa.
The municipality contains the Engenho Gargaú Private Natural Heritage Reserve, which holds a population of the critically endangered blond capuchin monkey (Cebus flavius).

See also
List of municipalities in Paraíba

References

Municipalities in Paraíba
Populated places established in 1890
Populated coastal places in Paraíba